Aust Severn Powerline Crossing is the longest overhead power line span in the United Kingdom with a length of .

History
The crossing spans the River Severn between Aust and Beachley and is part of the National Grid.

It was commissioned in 1959, and comprises two 275 kV electricity circuits, which form part of the 275 kV Iron Acton to Whitson line.

Construction
It is situated south of the Severn Bridge and was built by J. L. Eve Construction, which became Eve Group, and is now Babcock Networks. The pylon on the Aust side of the River Severn stands on a caisson accessible via a small bridge.

See also
 List of spans
 Powerline river crossings in the United Kingdom
 Crossings of the River Severn
 Crossings of the River Wye
Severn-Wye Cable Tunnel

References 

River Severn
Towers in Gloucestershire
Powerline river crossings
Electric power infrastructure in England
National Grid (Great Britain)
Tidenham
South Gloucestershire District